Early Spring is a hanging scroll painting by Guo Xi. Completed in 1072, it is one of the most famous works of Chinese art from the Song dynasty. The work demonstrates his innovative techniques for producing multiple perspectives which he called "the angle of totality."

The poem in the upper right corner was added in 1759 by the Qianlong Emperor.  It reads:

See also
Culture of the Song dynasty

References
Guo Xi's Early Spring

Song dynasty paintings